Pudukkottai block is a revenue block in Pudukkottai district, Tamil Nadu, India. It has a total of 31 panchayat villages.

Villages of Pudukkottai Block 
1.	Nathampannai (9a & 9b)       34.olagampaati
2.	Athanakottai   
3.	Ganapathypuram   
4.	Kallukaranpatti   
5.	Karupudayanpatti   
6.	Kavinadu   
7.	Kilavattam   
8.	Kavinadu   
9.	Mela Vattam   
10.	Kuppayampatti   
11.	M.kulavaipatti   
12.	Manaviduthi   
13.	Mangalathupatti   
14.	Mukkampatti   
15.	Mullur, Pudukkottai   
16.	Perungalur   
17.	Perungkondanviduthi   
18.	Ponnamaravathi 

19.	Puthampoor   
20.	Samatividuthi   
21.	Seempattur   
22.	Sothupallai   
23.	Thirumalairaya   
24.	Samutharam   
25.	Thondaiman, Pudukkottai   
26.	Oorani   
27.	Vadavalam   
28.	Vagavasal   
29.	Valavampatti   
30.	Vanarapatti   
31.	Varapur 
32. valyappati
33. Venndampaati

References 

 

Revenue blocks of Pudukkottai district